Where Eagles Dare is a 1968 war film directed by Brian G. Hutton and starring Richard Burton, Clint Eastwood and Mary Ure. It follows a joint British-American Special Operations Executive team of paratroopers raiding a castle (shot on location in Austria and Bavaria). It was filmed in Panavision using the Metrocolor process, and was distributed by Metro-Goldwyn-Mayer. Alistair MacLean wrote the screenplay, his first, at the same time that he wrote the novel of the same name. Both became commercial successes.

The film involved some of the top filmmakers of the day and is considered a classic. Hollywood stuntman Yakima Canutt was the second unit director and shot most of the action scenes; British stuntman Alf Joint doubled for Burton in many sequences, including the fight on top of the cable car; award-winning conductor and composer Ron Goodwin wrote the film score; and future Oscar-nominee Arthur Ibbetson worked on the cinematography.

Plot

In the winter of 1943–44, U.S. Army Brigadier General George Carnaby, a chief planner for the Western Front, is captured by the Germans and taken for interrogation to Schloß Adler, a mountaintop fortress accessible only by cable car. A team of seven Allied Special Operations Executive commandos, led by British Major John Smith of the Royal Engineers and U.S. Army Ranger Lieutenant Morris Schaffer, is briefed by Colonel Turner and Vice Admiral Rolland of MI6. Disguised as Wehrmacht mountain troops, they are to parachute into the German Alps, enter the castle, and rescue Carnaby before the Germans can interrogate him. After their transport plane drops them off, Smith secretly meets with agent Mary Ellison, with whom he is in a relationship, and his contact Heidi Schmidt. Heidi has arranged for Mary, posing as her cousin Maria, to work temporarily at the castle so the commandos can gain access.

Although two of the team are mysteriously killed, Smith continues the operation, keeping Schaffer as a close ally and secretly updating Rolland and Turner by radio. He reveals to Mary and Schaffer that Carnaby is actually an American corporal named Cartwright Jones, an ex-actor and lookalike of Carnaby trained to impersonate him. The Germans, tipped off to the operation, eventually surround the commandos in a gasthaus and force them to surrender. The officers, Smith and Schaffer, are separated from the rest of the team, Thomas, Berkeley, and Christiansen. Smith and Schaffer kill their captors, blow up a supply depot, and prepare an escape route. They reach the castle by riding on the roof of a cable car and climb inside using a rope lowered by Mary.

German General der Gebirgstruppe Rosemeyer and SS-Standartenführer Kramer are interrogating Carnaby when the three operatives, who claim to be double agents working for the Germans, arrive. Shortly thereafter, Smith and Schaffer intrude, weapons drawn, but Smith forces Schaffer to drop his weapon. He identifies himself as SS-Sturmbannführer Johann Schmidt of the SD, the SS intelligence branch and shows Kramer the name of Germany's top agent in Britain. Kramer affirms it and calls a high-ranking officer on Kesselring's staff who confirms that Smith is indeed Schmidt. To ensure the three agents are who they say they are, Schmidt proposes that they write down the names of their fellow agents in Britain, to be compared to the list he has in his pocket. After the three finish their lists, Schmidt reveals that he was bluffing; he is in fact a double agent for the Allies and that obtaining the list of agents was the mission's true objective.

Mary is visited by SS-Sturmbannführer von Hapen, a highly decorated Waffen-SS officer who is convalescing whilst on secondment to the SD and the Gestapo in Southern Bavaria. He is attracted to her but becomes suspicious of flaws in her cover story, and stumbles upon Carnaby's interrogation just as Smith finishes his explanation. Smith keeps him occupied before Mary arrives. Schaffer seizes the distraction to kill von Hapen and the other German officers with his silenced pistol. The group then make their escape with Jones and the German agents. Schaffer sets a series of explosives to create diversions around the castle while Smith leads the group to the radio room, where he informs Rolland of their success and asks for a transport plane home. During the escape, Thomas is sacrificed as a decoy, and Berkeley and Christiansen both attempt to escape before Smith kills them. The team reunites with Heidi on the ground, boarding a red post bus they had prepared earlier. They battle their way onto a nearby airfield and take off in their transport plane, where Turner welcomes them.

As Turner debriefs Smith about the mission, Smith reveals that Kramer named Turner as Germany's top agent in Britain. Rolland lured Turner and the others into participating in the fake mission so that MI6 could expose them; Smith's trusted partner Mary and the American Schaffer, who had no connection to MI6, had been assigned to the mission to ensure its success. Turner aims a Sten gun at Smith, who reveals that Rolland had the gun's firing pin removed earlier. He permits Turner to jump out of the plane to his death to avoid being tried for treason and executed. An exhausted Schaffer half-jokingly asks Smith to keep his next mission "an all-British operation".

Cast

 Richard Burton as Maj. John Smith / Maj. Johann Schmidt
 Clint Eastwood as Lt. Morris Schaffer
 Mary Ure as Mary Ellison
 Patrick Wymark as Col. Wyatt Turner
 Michael Hordern as Vice Admiral Rolland
 Donald Houston as Capt. Olaf Christiansen
 Peter Barkworth as Capt. Ted Berkeley
 William Squire as Capt. Lee Thomas
 Robert Beatty as Brig. Gen. George Carnaby / Cpl. Cartwright Jones
 Ingrid Pitt as Heidi Schmidt
 Brook Williams as Sgt. Harrod
 Neil McCarthy as Sgt. Jock MacPherson
 Vincent Ball as Wg Cdr. Cecil Carpenter
 Anton Diffring as Col. Paul Kramer
 Ferdy Mayne as Gen. Julius Rosemeyer
 Derren Nesbitt as Maj. von Hapen
 Philip Stone as cable car operator (uncredited)
 Victor Beaumont as Lt. Col. Weissner
 Guy Deghy as Maj. Wilhelm Wilner (uncredited)
 Derek Newark as SS Officer (uncredited)

Production

Development
Burton later said, "I decided to do the picture because Elizabeth's two sons said they were fed up with me making films they weren't allowed to see, or in which I get killed. They wanted me to kill a few people instead."

Burton approached producer Elliott Kastner "and asked him if he had some super-hero stuff for me where I don't get killed in the end."

The producer consulted MacLean and requested an adventure film filled with mystery, suspense, and action. Most of MacLean's novels had been made into films or were being filmed. Kastner persuaded MacLean to write a new story; six weeks later, he delivered the script, at that time entitled Castle of Eagles. Kastner hated the title, and chose Where Eagles Dare instead. The title is from Act I, Scene III, Line 71 in William Shakespeare's Richard III: "The world is grown so bad, that wrens make prey where eagles dare not perch". Like virtually all of MacLean's works, Where Eagles Dare features his trademark "secret traitor", who must be unmasked by the end.

Kastner and co-producer Jerry Gershwin announced in July 1966 that they had purchased five MacLean scripts, starting with Where Eagles Dare and When Eight Bells Toll. Brian Hutton had just made Sol Madrid for the producers and was signed to direct.

Filming
Eastwood and Burton reportedly dubbed the film 'Where Doubles Dare' due to the amount of screen time in which stand-ins doubled for the cast during action sequences. Filming began on 2 January 1968 in Austria and concluded in July 1968. Eastwood received a salary of $800,000 while Burton received $1,200,000. This is one of the first sound films to have used front projection effect. This technology enabled filming of the scenes where the actors are on top of the cable car.

Eastwood initially thought the script written by MacLean was "terrible" and was "all exposition and complications." According to Derren Nesbitt, Eastwood requested that he be given less dialogue. Most of Schaffer's lines were given to Burton, whilst Eastwood handled most of the action scenes. Director Hutton played to his actors' strengths, allowing for Burton's theatrical background to help the character of Smith and Eastwood's quiet demeanour to establish Schaffer. Eastwood took the part on the advice of his agent, who felt it would be interesting to see his client appear with someone with seniority. Eastwood and Burton got along well on set.

Derren Nesbitt was keen to be as authentic as possible with his character Von Hapen. Whilst on location, he requested to meet a former member of the Gestapo to better understand how to play the character and to get the military regalia correct. He was injured on set whilst filming the scene in which Schaffer kills Von Hapen. The blood squib attached to Nesbitt exploded with such force that he was temporarily blinded, though he made a quick recovery.

The filming was delayed due to the adverse weather in Austria. Shooting took place in winter and early spring of 1968, and the crew had to contend with blizzards, sub-zero temperatures and potential avalanches. Further delays were incurred when Richard Burton, well known for his drinking binges, disappeared for several days, with his friends Peter O'Toole, Trevor Howard and Richard Harris. As part of his deal with Metro-Goldwyn-Mayer, Clint Eastwood took delivery of a Norton P11 motorcycle, which he 'tested' at Brands Hatch racetrack, accompanied by Ingrid Pitt, something that he had been forbidden from doing by Kastner for insurance purposes in case of injury or worse.

Stuntman Alf Joint, who had played Capungo – the man whom 007 electrocuted in the bathtub in Goldfinger – doubled and was stand-in for Richard Burton, and performed the famous cable car jump sequence, during which he lost three teeth. Joint stated that at one point during production, Burton was so drunk that he knocked himself out while filming and Joint had to quickly fill in for him. Derren Nesbitt observed that Burton was drinking as many as four bottles of vodka per day.

Visitors to the set included Burton's wife Elizabeth Taylor,
and Robert Shaw, who was then married to Mary Ure.

At one point during filming, Burton was threatened at gunpoint by an overzealous fan, but fortunately danger was averted.

The Junkers Ju 52 used to fly Smith and Schaffer's team into Austria and then make their escape at the end of the film was a Swiss Air Force Ju 52/3m, registration A-702. It was destroyed in an accident on 4 August 2018, killing all 20 people on board.
 The castle – Hohenwerfen Castle, Werfen, Austria; filmed in January 1968.
 Cable car – Feuerkogel Seilbahn at Ebensee, Austria; filmed in January 1968.
 Note: the scenes featuring the castle and the cable car together were filmed using a scale model.
 Airport scenes – Flugplatz at Aigen im Ennstal, Austria; filmed in early 1968. The exact place of filming is the "Fiala-Fernbrugg" garrison, still used by HS Geschwader 2 and FlAR2/3rd Bat. of the Austrian Army. The big rocky mountain in the background of the airfield is the Grimming mountains, about 40 km east of the "Hoher Dachstein", or about 80 km east and 10 km south from Werfen.
 The village – Lofer, Austria; filmed in January 1968.
 Other scenes – MGM-British Studios, Borehamwood, England; filmed in spring 1968.

Reception
Where Eagles Dare received a Royal premiere at the Empire, Leicester Square cinema on 22 January 1969 with Princess Alexandra in attendance. Of the stars of the film, only Clint Eastwood was not present as he was filming Two Mules for Sister Sara in Mexico.

Where Eagles Dare was a huge success, earning $6,560,000 at the North American box office during its first year of release. It was the seventh-most popular film at the UK box office in 1969, and 13th in the US.

Though many critics found the plot somewhat confusing, reviews of the film were generally positive.
Vincent Canby of the New York Times gave a positive review, praising the action scenes and cinematography. Likewise, Variety praised the film, describing it as 'thrilling'. The film was particularly lucrative for Richard Burton, who earned a considerable sum in royalties through television repeats and video sales. Where Eagles Dare had its first showing on British television on 26 December 1979 on BBC1.

Mad Magazine published a satire of the film in its October 1969 issue under the title "Where Vultures Fare." In 2009 Cinema Retro released a special issue dedicated to Where Eagles Dare which detailed the production and filming of the film.

Years after its debut, Where Eagles Dare enjoys a reputation as a classic and is considered by many as one of the best war films of all time.

Soundtrack

The score was composed by Ron Goodwin. A soundtrack was released on Compact Disc in 2005 by Film Score Monthly, of the Silver Age Classics series, in association with Turner Entertainment. It was a two-disc release, the first CD being the film music, the second the film music for Operation Crossbow and source music for Where Eagles Dare. The release has been limited to 3,000 pressings.

Novel

The principal difference is that the 1966 novel by Alistair MacLean is less violent. One scene during the escape from the castle where Smith saves a German guard from burning to death presaged the non-lethal thriller vein that MacLean would explore in his later career. In the novel the characters are more clearly defined and slightly more humorous than their depictions in the film, which is fast-paced and has sombre performances from Burton and Eastwood at its centre. Three characters are differently named in the novel: Ted Berkeley is called Edward Carraciola, Jock MacPherson is called Torrance-Smythe, and Major von Hapen is instead Captain von Brauchitsch. The love stories between Schaffer and Heidi and between Smith and Mary were also cut. Indeed, in the novel Smith asks London to arrange for a priest to meet them at the airport.

In the book the group is flown into Germany on board an RAF Avro Lancaster, whereas in the film they are transported in a Luftwaffe Junkers Ju 52. While in the film Kramer, Rosemeyer, and Von Hapen are shot dead by Schaffer and Smith, in the novel they are just given high doses of nembutal. In the book Thomas, Carraciola, and Christiansen attempt to escape in the cable car with Smith on the roof. Carraciola is crushed by the steel suspension arm of the cable car while struggling with Smith on the roof; Thomas and Christiansen fall to their deaths after Smith blows the cable car up with plastic explosive. In the film Christiansen is killed and Berkeley (Carraciola in the novel) incapacitated by Smith on the cable car (he dies apparently when the cable car explodes), and Thomas is shot and killed by a German soldier while climbing down a rope.

In popular culture
In 1979, cult punk act The Misfits released a single featuring a song named after the film.

The British heavy metal band Iron Maiden recorded a song called "Where Eagles Dare" on their 1983 album Piece of Mind. The live performance features Bruce Dickinson in snow camouflage and Richard Burton's "Broadsword calling Danny Boy" message as an intro.

Geoff Dyer's long essay Broadsword Calling Danny Boy: On When Eagles Dare was published in 2018.

References
Notes

Bibliography
 
 
 Dyer, Geoff (2018). Broadsword Calling Danny Boy. London: Penguin Books. .

External links 
 
 
 
 
 
 
 Film review at AlistairMacLean.com
 Where Eagles Dare Website
 Film Locations used in Where Eagles Dare
 Film Production for Where Eagles Dare

1968 films
1960s action war films
British action war films
British war adventure films
Films based on British novels
Films based on military novels
Films based on works by Alistair MacLean
1960s war adventure films
Novels set during World War II
World War II films based on actual events
World War II spy films
Films directed by Brian G. Hutton
Metro-Goldwyn-Mayer films
Films set in 1943
Films set in 1944
Films set in Austria
Films set in Germany
Films set in the Alps
Films shot in Austria
Films shot in Bavaria
1967 British novels
Novels by Alistair MacLean
William Collins, Sons books
Films scored by Ron Goodwin
Films produced by Elliott Kastner
Films set in castles
British World War II films
Films shot at MGM-British Studios
1960s English-language films
1960s British films